R, or r, is the eighteenth letter of the Latin alphabet, used in the modern English alphabet, the alphabets of other western European languages and others worldwide.

The letter  is used to form the ending "-re", which is used in certain words such as centre in some varieties of English spelling, such as British English. Canadian English also uses the "-re" ending, unlike American English, where the ending is usually replaced by "-er" (center). This does not affect pronunciation.

Name 

A good example of a trilled R is in the Spanish word for dog, perro.

In William Shakespeare's Romeo and Juliet, such a reference is made by Juliet's nurse in Act 2, scene 4, when she calls the letter R "the dog's name". The reference is also found in Ben Jonson's English Grammar.

History

Antiquity

The letter R is believed to derive ultimately from an image of a head, used in Semitic alphabets for the sound /r/ because the word for "head" was rêš (or similar) in most Semitic languages.  The word became the name of the letter, as an example of acrophony.

It developed into Greek 'Ρ'  (rhô) and Latin R. The descending diagonal stroke develops as a graphic variant in some Western Greek alphabets (writing rho as ), but it was not adopted in most Old Italic alphabets; most Old Italic alphabets show variants of their rho between a "P" and a "D" shape, but without the Western Greek descending stroke.
Indeed, the oldest known forms of the Latin alphabet itself of the 7th to 6th centuries BC, in the Duenos and the Forum inscription, still write r using the "P" shape of the letter.
The Lapis Satricanus inscription shows the form of the Latin alphabet around 500 BC. Here, the rounded, closing Π shape of the p  and the Ρ shape of the r have become difficult to distinguish.
The descending stroke of the Latin letter R has fully developed by the 3rd century BC, as seen in the Tomb of the Scipios sarcophagus inscriptions of that era. From around 50 AD, the letter P would be written with its loop fully closed, assuming the shape formerly taken by R.

Cursive

The minuscule (lowercase) form (r) developed through several variations on the capital form.
Along with Latin minuscule writing in general, it developed  ultimately from Roman cursive via the uncial script of Late Antiquity into the Carolingian minuscule of the 9th century.

In handwriting, it was common not to close the bottom of the loop but continue into the leg, saving an extra pen stroke. The loop-leg stroke shortened into the simple arc used in the Carolingian minuscule and until today.

A calligraphic minuscule r, known as r rotunda (ꝛ), was used in the sequence or, bending the shape of the r to accommodate the bulge of the o (as in oꝛ as opposed to or). Later, the same variant was also used where r followed other lower case letters with a rounded loop towards the right (such as b, h, p) and to write the geminate rr (as ꝛꝛ). Use of r rotunda was mostly tied to blackletter typefaces, and the glyph fell out of use along with blackletter fonts in English language contexts mostly by the 18th century.

Insular script used a minuscule which retained two downward strokes, but which did not close the loop ("Insular r", ꞃ); this variant survives in the Gaelic type popular in Ireland until the mid-20th century (but now mostly limited to decorative purposes).

Pronunciation and use

Non-English languages
 represents a rhotic consonant in many languages, as shown in the table below.

Other languages may use the letter  in their alphabets (or Latin transliterations schemes) to represent rhotic consonants different from the alveolar trill. 'Kweyol' for 'Kreyol'.

Other systems
The International Phonetic Alphabet uses several variations of the letter to represent the different rhotic consonants;  represents the alveolar trill.

Related characters

Descendants and related characters in the Latin alphabet
 R with diacritics: Ŕ ŕ Ɍ ɍ Ř ř Ŗ ŗ Ṙ ṙ Ȑ ȑ Ȓ ȓ Ṛ ṛ Ṝ ṝ Ṟ ṟ Ꞧ ꞧ Ɽ ɽ R̃ r̃ ᵲ ꭨ ᵳ ᶉ
 International Phonetic Alphabet-specific symbols related to R:         ʶ ˞ ʴ
 IPA superscript letters: 𐞦 𐞧 𐞨 𐞩 𐞪
 Obsolete and nonstandard symbols in the International Phonetic Alphabet: ɼ ɿ
 Uralic Phonetic Alphabet-specific symbols related to R:
 
 
 
 
 Teuthonista phonetic transcription-specific symbols related to R:
 
 
 Anthropos phonetic transcription:
 
 
 
 Otto Bremer's phonetic transcription:
 
 
 
 𝼨 : R with mid-height left hook was used by the British and Foreign Bible Society in the early 20th century for romanization of the Malayalam language.
 ⱹ : Turned r with tail is used in the Swedish Dialect Alphabet
 Other variations of R used for phonetic transcription: 𝼕 𝼖

Calligraphic variants in the Latin alphabet
 Ꝛ ꝛ : R rotunda
 Ꞃ ꞃ : "Insular" R (Gaelic type)
 ᫍ : Combining insular r was used in the Ormulum

Ancestors and siblings in other alphabets
 𐤓 : Semitic letter Resh, from which the following letters derive
 Ρ ρ : Greek letter Rho, from which the following letters derive
 𐌓 : Old Italic letter R, the ancestor of modern Latin R
 ᚱ : Runic letter Raido
 Р р : Cyrillic letter Er
 𐍂 : Gothic letter Reda

Abbreviations, signs and symbols
 ℟ : symbol for "response" in liturgy
  : Medical prescription Rx
 ® : Registered trademark symbol
 ₹ : Indian rupee sign

Encoding

 1

See also
 Guttural R

References

External links
 
 
 

ISO basic Latin letters